Saint-Maur-des-Bois is a commune in the Manche department in Normandy in north-western France, close to the border with the Calvados department.

It takes its name from Saint Maurus to whom the parish church is dedicated.

See also
Communes of the Manche department

References

Saintmaurdesbois